The Tanzania Naval Command is the naval military branch of the Tanzania People's Defence Force (TPDF). It was established in 1971 with assistance from China.

History
In the years immediately following independence, Tanzania did not have a navy. Coastal patrols were performed by the Police Marine Unit, using four Type 368 craft lent by the West-German government. Cooperation ended abruptly following the recognition of East Germany by the Tanzanian government in February 1965. Four Shanghai-class boats were given to the Police by the Government of the People's Republic of China to replace the West-German vessels. These were to later form the nucleus of the Tanzanian Naval Command.

In 1968, the PRC reached an agreement to build a naval base for the TNC. Work on the facility began in January 1970, and was complete in December 1971.

Ships and weapons 
As of 2016, the assets of the Tanzania Naval Command included:
 Four Huchuan class torpedo boats
 Two Ngunguri class vessels
 Two Shanghai II class patrol craft
 Two 27-foot Defender-type patrol boats
 Two Yuch'in class landing craft.

In 2015–6, Tanzania replaced the two landing craft with similar Chinese Type 068 vessels. The new 28-metre vessels, Mbono and Sehewa, took part in an amphibious operation demonstration on 30 September 2016. They unloaded infantry and Type 63A amphibious light tanks as part of the exercise. The landing craft were delivered to the naval base in Dar es Salaam by January 2016.

Bases
 Kigamboni Naval Base, Dar es Salaam

References

External links
 

Military of Tanzania
T
Military units and formations established in 1971